The Danish Rugby Union (DRU) is the governing body for rugby union in Denmark. Rugby began being played in Denmark in 1931 but it was not until 1950 that the DRU was established. In 1971 the DRU joined FIRA - Association of European Rugby followed by the Skandinavisk Rugby Union in 1974 before finally joining the International Rugby Board (now World Rugby) in 1988.

References

See also
Denmark national rugby union team

Rugby union in Denmark
Rugby union governing bodies in Europe
Rugby
Sports organizations established in 1950